The RC Mainz is a German rugby union club from Mainz, currently playing in the Rugby-Bundesliga.

History
Rugby in Mainz dates back to 1997, when a rugby department was formed in the 1. FC Vorwärts Orient Mainz. Two years later, in 1999, this rugby department formed the current RC Mainz.

The club competed at the third tier of German club rugby at the time, the Rugby-Regionalliga. Oddly, it took part in two of the Regionalligas local divisions, Hesse and Rhineland-Palatinate. The city of Mainz is located in Rhineland-Palatinate, but just across the river from Hesse.

In the 2001-02 season, the club celebrated its first success, promotion to the 2nd Rugby-Bundesliga. In this league, it was able to survive for only one season, being promptly relegated back to the third division again.

The team achieved promotion to the 2nd Bundesliga once more when it won the Regionalliga Rhineland-Palatinate, as well as the Regionalliga Hesse. The club was saved from relegation after its first season there when the league was enlarged and has since improved in its performance.

The club suffered relegation in 2010 but bounced straight back, finishing runners-up in the new 3rd Liga South/West and returning to the 2nd Bundesliga.

A league reform in 2012 allowed the club promotion to the Bundesliga after the league was expanded from ten to 24 teams. RC finished third in their group in the 2012-13 season and qualified for the south/west division of the championship round, where it came eighth. The club was knocked out in the first round of the play-offs after losing 131–3 to DSV 78 Hannover.

The club qualified for the play-offs to the DRV-Pokal in 2013–14, the second-tier competition in German rugby, where it was knocked out by SG Siemensstadt/Grizzlies in the first round. For the 2014–15 season the club entered the 2nd Rugby-Bundesliga but was only able to qualify for the Liga-Pokal round where it came seventh and missed out on the play-offs. Mainz dropped back to the third tier for the following season.

Club honours
 Rugby-Regionalliga Rhineland-Palatinate
 Champions: 2002, 2004, 2007
 Rugby-Regionalliga Hessen
 Champions: 2007

Recent seasons
Recent seasons of the club:

 Until 2001, when the single-division Bundesliga was established, the season was divided in autumn and spring, a Vorrunde and Endrunde, whereby the top teams of the Rugby-Bundesliga would play out the championship while the bottom teams together with the autumn 2nd Bundesliga champion would play for Bundesliga qualification. The remainder of the 2nd Bundesliga teams would play a spring round to determine the relegated clubs. Where two placing's are shown, the first is autumn, the second spring. In 2012 the Bundesliga was expanded from ten to 24 teams and the 2nd Bundesliga from 20 to 24  with the leagues divided into four regional divisions.

References

External links
  Official website
  RC Mainz club info at totalrugby.de

German rugby union clubs
Rugby clubs established in 1999
Rugby union in Rhineland-Palatinate
1999 establishments in Germany
Rc